Five ships of the Royal Navy have borne the name HMS Harwich, after the town of Harwich. A sixth was planned, but renamed before entering service:

 was a 5-gun hoy launched in 1660 and sold in 1680.
 was a 70-gun third rate launched in 1674 and wrecked in 1691.
 was a 48-gun fifth rate launched in 1695 and wrecked in 1700.
 was a storeship launched in 1709 and sold in 1714.
 was a 50-gun fourth rate launched in 1743 as HMS Tiger. She was renamed HMS Harwich later that year and was wrecked in 1760.
She was renamed  in 1941 and launched in 1942 for the Royal Indian Navy. She was broken up in 1949.

Royal Navy ship names